The 2018–19 Sri Lanka Champions League, known as the 2018–19 Dialog Champions League due to sponsorship reasons, was the 34th season of the Sri Lanka Champions League, the top-tier football league in Sri Lanka. The season started on 21 October 2018, rather than original scheduled date of June, due to the 2018 SAFF Championship, and ended on 24 February 2019.

Teams
A total of 18 teams competed in the league. Colombo were the defending champions, having won the previous three titles. Police and Moragasmulla were relegated from last season, and were replaced by promoted teams Red Stars and Ratnam.

Air Force
Blue Star
Colombo
Crystal Palace
Defenders (renamed from Army SC)
Java Lane
Matara City
Navy Sea Hawks (renamed from Navy SC)
Negombo Youth
New Young's
Pelicans
Ratnam
Red Stars
Renown
Saunders
Solid
Super Sun
Upcountry Lions

League table

See also
2018 Sri Lanka FA Cup

References

External links
Football Federation of Sri Lanka
The Papare

Sri Lanka Football Premier League seasons
1
Sri Lanka